Mark Hardy (born February 1, 1959) is a Swiss-born Canadian former professional ice hockey defenseman who played 15 seasons in the National Hockey League (NHL) for the Los Angeles Kings, New York Rangers and Minnesota North Stars between 1979 and 1994.  A professional hockey coach for 20 years, Hardy was most recently an assistant coach with the Tucson Roadrunners of the American Hockey League (AHL), the top-most minor league affiliate of the Arizona Coyotes.

NHL career
Hardy was born in Switzerland where his father, Lea was playing professional hockey before moving to Montreal as a child. He played four seasons of junior in the Quebec Major Junior Hockey League for the Montreal Juniors and was selected 30th overall by the Los Angeles Kings at the 1979 NHL Entry Draft.

Hardy is ranked 3rd in all-time scoring by an LA Kings defenseman. He played 915 career NHL games, scoring 62 goals and 306 assists for 368 points while adding 1293 penalty minutes. His best offensive season was the 1984–85 season when he set career highs with 14 goals and 53 points.

In 1992–93 Hardy and the Kings went to the Stanley Cup Finals for the first time in Kings' history. Hardy delivered what was called at the time an "iconic hit" in Game 3, when the Kings were down 3-0 in the second, putting Montreal Canadiens' Mike Keane through the boards with enough force to disrupt two panes of glass to change the momentum of the game. The Kings scored three second-period goals, but lost 4-3 in overtime.

Coaching career

Retiring from the NHL as a King following the 1993–94 season, Hardy turned to coaching in 1999, serving as an assistant coach for the Los Angeles Kings and the Chicago Blackhawks until 2010.

He returned to the Kings organization in 2011 as an assistant coach with the club's minor league team, the Ontario Reign of the ECHL.

Hardy resigned from the Kings organization in June 2010 after being charged with fourth-degree sexual abuse. Hardy had been arrested in May 2010 after a family member had filed a complaint alleging Hardy had make inappropriate sexual contact with her after they returned to their hotel from a bar. The prosecution eventually decided not to go forward and the charge was dropped.

Hardy accepted a position as assistant coach with the Chicago Wolves of the American Hockey League (AHL), the minor league team for the St. Louis Blues in August 2014.

In June 2016, he was hired as an assistant coach of the Tucson Roadrunners.

TV appearances and radio broadcasts
As an invited guest hockey analyst for TV appearances and  radio broadcasts during the 2014 Stanley Cup Playoffs, Hardy reunited with his former Kings coach Barry Melrose on NHL Network; as a regular analyst during the Western Conference and Stanley Cup Finals on NBC Sports LA with Fred Roggin; and appeared on TSN and the Petros & Money Show on Fox Sports Radio.

International
Hardy played for Team Canada at the World Championships in 1986.

Family
Hardy is the son of Olympic figure skater Barbara Wyatt and former ice hockey player Lea Hardy.

Career statistics

Regular season and playoffs

International

References

External links
 

1959 births
Living people
Anglophone Quebec people
Canadian ice hockey defencemen
Chicago Blackhawks coaches
Ice hockey people from Montreal
Los Angeles Kings coaches
Los Angeles Kings draft picks
Los Angeles Kings players
Minnesota North Stars players
Montreal Juniors players
New York Rangers players
Phoenix Roadrunners (IHL) players
Ice hockey player-coaches
Canadian ice hockey coaches